Carl Personne (11 May 1888 – 4 October 1976) was a Swedish foil and sabre fencer. He competed in three events at the 1912 Summer Olympics.

References

External links
 

1888 births
1976 deaths
People from Mjölby Municipality
Swedish male foil fencers
Swedish male sabre fencers
Olympic fencers of Sweden
Fencers at the 1912 Summer Olympics
Sportspeople from Östergötland County
20th-century Swedish people